Taylor Township is a township in Grundy County, in the U.S. state of Missouri.

Taylor Township was established in 1872, taking its name from President Zachary Taylor.

References

Townships in Missouri
Townships in Grundy County, Missouri